Jon Joseph Waronker (born May 20, 1969) is an American drummer and music producer. He is best known as a regular drummer of both Beck and R.E.M., and as member of the experimental rock bands Atoms for Peace and Ultraísta.

Background
Waronker was born in Los Angeles, the son of producer Lenny Waronker and actress and musician Donna Loren. He has two sisters (one being musician Anna Waronker) and two half-sisters. His grandfather was classical violinist Simon Waronker, namesake for the "Simon" character in the Alvin and the Chipmunks franchise. Joey was a student of the renowned teacher Freddie Gruber.

Drumming career

Walt Mink
Waronker's first professional project was the alternative rock band Walt Mink, which he helped form while attending Macalester College in St. Paul, Minnesota, in 1989. The band's name was taken from that of a former psychology professor at Macalester. He played on their first two albums, Miss Happiness (1992) and Bareback Ride (1993).

Beck
Left-handed Waronker first became well known in the late 1990s for his work with Beck (on Odelay, Mutations, Midnite Vultures, Sea Change, Guero, Modern Guilt, and Morning Phase). He continues to tour and record periodically with Beck.

Elliott Smith
In 1998, Waronker played drums on two songs ("Bled White" and "Bottle Up and Explode!") on Elliott Smith's XO album. He also appeared on "Stupidity Tries" on Smith's next release, 2000's Figure 8.

R.E.M.

In October 1997, R.E.M.'s drummer Bill Berry left the band in pursuit of a quieter life. Seven months later, as R.E.M. rehearsed in Athens, Georgia, for a tour in support of that year's Up album, Waronker entered the band and toured with them in support of the tour. His first performance with R.E.M. was in Washington, D.C., at the Tibetan Freedom Concert at RFK Stadium.

Between 1998 and 2002, Waronker toured with R.E.M. and appeared on two albums, 1998's Up and 2001's Reveal.

Roger Waters
Waronker played drums on Roger Waters' album Is This the Life We Really Want? (2017) and joined Waters' band during the Us + Them Tour. He contributed to Waters' Lockdown Session and is performing on Waters' This is Not a Drill tour (2022–2023).

Other work
Waronker has played on a wide range of albums since beginning his professional career in the mid-1990s.  Highlights include recordings with Paul McCartney, Roger Waters, Johnny Cash, Norah Jones, Yoko Ono, Pink, Leonard Cohen, Dwight Yoakam, Thurston Moore, Daniel Johnston, Doobie Brothers, Bat For Lashes, Pete Yorn, AIR, Charlotte Gainsbourg, Richard Thompson, Gnarls Barkley, Jeff Martin's Idaho, Brett Dennon, Benji Hughes, Tracy Chapman, Leona Ness, Sia, John Doe, Five For Fighting, Nelly Furtado, Yusuf Islam (Cat Stevens), Lisa Marie Presley, Willie DeVille, The Vines, Badly Drawn Boy, Rufus Wainwright, R.L. Burnside and Ima Robot.

Some of his drumming can be instantly recognized on The Vines' "Get Free", Smashing Pumpkins' "Perfect", Beck's "Chemtrails" and Air's "Photograph", among others.

He has produced numerous acts, most notably "Tamer Animals" and "Rituals" from Other Lives, as well as albums for Yeasayer, Priscilla Ahn, Lisa Germano, Eels, Carole Facal, and The Moth & the Flame.

In 2009, Waronker joined Thom Yorke, Nigel Godrich, Mauro Refosco and Flea to play material from Yorke's album The Eraser, as well as other original pieces, for three dates in Los Angeles in October 2009.  The band, now named Atoms for Peace, then played a brief tour of America in April 2010. Their full-length album Amok was released February 25, 2013 on XL Records. Waronker later contributed drums to the song "The Axe" from Yorke's third studio album, Anima.

He currently plays drums with his band, Ultraísta, formed with bandmates Nigel Godrich and Laura Bettison. Their debut album was released on Temporary Residence on October 2, 2012. A remix single of their song "Smalltalk" was released September 18, 2012 on Ghostly International. He performed on six tracks on Brandon Flowers' The Desired Effect, which reached number one in the United Kingdom.

Waronker plays on Irish folk musician Malojian's 2017 album, "Let Your Weirdness Carry You Home."

Waronker also played on three songs from The Who's album Who, released in December 2019.

Equipment
Waronker uses Istanbul Agop Cymbals, C&C Custom Drum Company, and Innovative Percussion Drumsticks

Soundtrack work

In 1996, Waronker scored Miguel Arteta's movie Star Maps, followed by Chuck & Buck in 2000 and The Good Girl in 2002. He has also scored several documentary movies for AMC, including 2002's Lost in La Mancha. Other Waronker compositions have appeared in the drama Alias, the sit-com Malcolm in the Middle and on FOX Sports.

His drumming performances have appeared in a number of scores, including Man on the Moon (1999), Badly Drawn Boy's About a Boy soundtrack (2002), Collateral (2004), Dawn of the Dead (2004), and Walking Tall (2004).

Collaborations 
 Let It Rain – Tracy Chapman (2002)
 Folklore – Nelly Furtado (2003)
 Chariot – Gavin DeGraw (2003)
 Melancolista – Adam Cohen (2004)
 Chaos and Creation in the Backyard – Paul McCartney (2005)
 Fires – Nerina Pallot (2005)
 How the Mighty Fall – Mark Owen (2005)
 What's Left of Me – Nick Lachey (2006)
 Loose – Nelly Furtado (2006)
 Two Lights (album) – Five for Fighting (2006)
 The Sermon on Exposition Boulevard – Rickie Lee Jones (2007)
 Our Bright Future – Tracy Chapman (2008)
 The Fall – Norah Jones (2009)
 IRM – Charlotte Gainsbourg (2009)
 ...Little Broken Hearts – Norah Jones (2012)
 AMOK – Atoms for Peace (2013)
 Melody Road – Neil Diamond (2014)
 The Desired Effect – Brandon Flowers (2015)
 Is This the Life We Really Want? – Roger Waters (2017)
 American Utopia – David Byrne (2018)

References

1969 births
Living people
American rock drummers
American people of German-Jewish descent
American session musicians
Musicians from Los Angeles
R.E.M. personnel
Crossroads School alumni
Atoms for Peace (band) members
20th-century American drummers
American male drummers